Teresa P. Pica (26 September 1945 – 15 November 2011), also known as Tere Pica, was Professor of Education at the University of Pennsylvania Graduate School of Education, a post she held from 1983 until her death in 2011. Her areas of expertise included second language acquisition, language curriculum design, approaches to classroom practice, and classroom discourse analysis. Pica was well known for her pioneering work in task-based language learning and published widely in established international journals in the field of English as a foreign or second language and applied linguistics.

Early years
Before entering the field of TESOL, Pica was a speech and language pathologist. She earned her Ph.D. in educational linguistics from the University of Pennsylvania Graduate School of Education in three years, graduating in 1982. Pica graduated from the College of New Rochelle (bachelor's degree, English and speech communications, 1967) and Columbia University with a master's degree in speech pathology in 1969.

In 1983, she took over the position of her advisor, Michael Long, who left Penn in 1982.

Teaching
Pica's passion in life was teaching and advising students. She was known for never taking summers or sabbatical years off and for always teaching multiple sections of two core courses in the TESOL MSEd program: "EDUC 527: Approaches to Teaching English and Other Modern Languages" and "EDUC 670: Second Language Acquisition". By doing this, she taught thousands of TESOL Master's degree seekers from all over the world over her 30-year tenure at Penn GSE.

Pica supervised more than 50 doctoral dissertations at Penn and at universities abroad. Some of her best-known advisees include her first two doctoral students, Jessica Williams (1987) and Catherine Doughty (1988), as well as Richard Young, Valerie Jakar, Joanna Labov, and Shannon Sauro.  Tere's last doctoral student to complete was Elizabeth Scheyder (dissertation defended 10/26/11, degree awarded 2012).

References

External links
Teresa P. Pica's profile at the University of Pennsylvania
Teresa P. "Tere" Pica's Memorial Site

Educators from Philadelphia
Linguists
Applied linguists
1945 births
2011 deaths
University of Pennsylvania faculty
University of Pennsylvania Graduate School of Education alumni
College of New Rochelle alumni
Teachers College, Columbia University alumni
American women academics
21st-century American women